British Equestrian (previously the British Equestrian Federation), founded 1972 is the national governing body of equestrian sport in Great Britain and represents the country at the International Federation for Equestrian Sports. Her Majesty the Queen Consort is the organisation's Patron.

Remit
As an umbrella body, the purpose of the federation is the steering of equestrianism in Britain.

Together with the British Horseracing Authority and the Thoroughbred Breeders Association, the federation forms the British Horse Industry Confederation. In 2022 the body has 712 officials, 1043 registered athletes and 2318 registered horses.

Leadership

The leaderships stands for a period of four years, with a maximum of two terms.  The chairman is Malcom Wharton as of 2020, with previous chairmen including Badminton Horse Trials organiser Hugh Thomas.

Membership
British Equestrian is formed of eighteen (fifteen full, three associate) independent member bodies who represent the various equestrian sports.

Full members
British Dressage
British Eventing
British Showjumping Association
British Horse Society
The Pony Club
British Equestrian Vaulting
British Carriagedriving
British Reining
Endurance GB
Association of British Riding Schools
Horsescotland
Riding for the Disabled Association
British Horseball Association
Mounted Games Association of Great Britain
UK Polocrosse Association

Associate members
British Equestrian Trade Association
British Grooms Association
The Showing Council

References

AUS
Equestrian
Animal charities based in the United Kingdom
Organisations based in Warwickshire
Equestrian sports in the United Kingdom
1972 establishments in the United Kingdom
Sports organizations established in 1972